Samuel Robert Graves  (7 June 1818 – 18 January 1873) was an Irish-born  businessman and Conservative politician who sat in the House of Commons of the United Kingdom from 1865 to 1873.

Graves was the son of William Graves and his wife Sarah Elly daughter of Samuel Elly of New Ross. He was educated at a private school at New Ross. He was a merchant and shipowner, and a director of the London and North Western Railway. In 1861 he was mayor of Liverpool. He was a Member of the Royal Commission to inquire into the management of Lights, Buoys, and Beacons. He was commodore of the Royal Mersey Yacht Club and author of "National Dangers," and " A Cruise in the Baltic."

At the 1865 general election Graves was elected Member of Parliament for Liverpool. He held the seat until his death in 1873.

Graves married Elizabeth Haughton, daughter of Samuel Haughton of Burrin House, Carlow in 1848.

Graves died at the age of 54 and is buried in Toxteth Park Cemetery.

See also
List of statues and sculptures in Liverpool

References

External links 
 

1818 births
1873 deaths
UK MPs 1868–1874
UK MPs 1865–1868
Mayors of Liverpool
Members of the Parliament of the United Kingdom for Liverpool
Conservative Party (UK) MPs for English constituencies